The Right–Tricolour Flame (La Destra–Fiamma Tricolore) was an Italian political coalition formed by two neofascist party: The Right of Francesco Storace and Tricolour Flame of Luca Romagnoli on 15 February 2008 in the run-up to the 2008 general election.

Daniela Santanchè was the Candidate for Prime Minister.

The list received 885,229 or 2.43% of the popular vote in the 2008 general elections and was awarded no representatives in the Chamber of Deputies or the Senate.

Compostition

References

Defunct political party alliances in Italy
2008 establishments in Italy
2009 disestablishments in Italy
Neo-fascist parties